Hrib (a Slovene word for hill) may refer to several settlements:

Places

Croatia
 , a village near Čabar

Slovenia
Hrib, Preddvor, a settlement in the Municipality of Preddvor
Hrib, Šmarješke Toplice, a settlement in the Municipality of Šmarješke Toplice
Hrib nad Ribčami, a settlement in the Municipality of Moravče
Hrib pri Cerovcu, a settlement in the Municipality of Semič
Hrib pri Fari, a settlement in the Municipality of Kostel
Hrib pri Hinjah, a settlement in the Municipality of Žužemberk
Hrib pri Kamniku, a settlement in the Municipality of Kamnik
Hrib pri Koprivniku, a settlement in the Municipality of Kočevje
Hrib pri Orehku, a settlement in the Municipality of Novo Mesto
Hrib pri Rožnem Dolu, a settlement in the Municipality of Semič
Hrib–Loški Potok, a settlement in the Municipality of Loški Potok
Svetega Petra Hrib, a settlement in the Municipality of Škofja Loka (known as Hrib pri Zmincu, 1955–1994)

Other
Hřib (the Czech word for boletus) may refer to:

Zdeněk Hřib, Czech manager and politician

See also